Florijan Matekalo (25 April 1920 – 20 May 1995) was a footballer who played international football for both Yugoslavia and Croatia.

He scored the first goal in the history of the Croatian national team and the first goal ever for FK Partizan.

International career
Matekalo debuted for the Kingdom of Yugoslavia's national team (Beli Orlovi) in a November 1940 friendly match against Nazi Germany and concurrently played all four matches for the Banovina of Croatia's national team, which represented the Croatian statelet within the kingdom.

References

External links
 
 

1920 births
1995 deaths
People from Jajce
Croats of Bosnia and Herzegovina
Association football midfielders
Croatian footballers
Croatia international footballers
Yugoslav footballers
Yugoslavia international footballers
Dual internationalists (football)
FK Slavija Sarajevo players
HŠK Građanski Zagreb players
FK Partizan players
Yugoslav First League players
Yugoslav football managers
HNK Hajduk Split managers
FK Partizan managers
FK Radnički 1923 managers
Yugoslav First League managers
Burials at Belgrade New Cemetery